Assam Lemon, also known as Nemu Tenga in Assamese, are cultivars of lemon, which are found and cultivated in the Indian state of Assam. The most popular of them are 'Gol Nemu' and 'Kaji Nemu'. These lemons are an important part of Assamese cuisine.

Assam lemons are used for preparing refreshing drinks and pickles as well as garnishing curry and other dishes.

Other citrus from Assam includes Jora Tenga, Bore Tenga, Elaichi Tenga etc.

Varieties

Gol Nemu 
Gol Nemu is similar to the other lemons found in India. Its botanical name is Citrus jambhiri. It is round but smaller than other varieties and has an aroma. It is sweeter than other lemons and Kaji Nemu. When the lemon ripens, its colour changes to yellow and it becomes sweeter.

Kaji Nemu 

Kaji Nemu is other variety of this lemon and is elongated and oblong compared to others and is also seedless. Its botanical name is Citrus jambhiri and is a GI-certified product. This lemon is generally juicer than Gol Nemu due to its longer size. It is popular in Assam and is associated with Assamese cuisine. It is as generally larger than Gol Nemu and also turns yellow during ripening.

Major producing districts include Dibrugarh, Golaghat, Cachar, Chirang, Nalbari and Dima Hasao.

Comparison of some varieties

References 

Lemons

Sour fruits
Citrus hybrids